Nigel Beaumont (born 11 February 1967) is an English former professional footballer who made more than 100 Football League appearances playing as a central defender.

Career
Born in Hemsworth, Beaumont played in the Football League for Bradford City and Wrexham. While at Wrexham, he was Player of the Season during 1989–90. He later played non-league football for Telford United, and in Wales for Brymbo and Lex XI. Beaumont was also an assistant manager at Lex XI.

References

1967 births
Living people
People from Hemsworth
English footballers
Association football central defenders
Bradford City A.F.C. players
Wrexham A.F.C. players
Telford United F.C. players
Brymbo F.C. players
Lex XI F.C. players
English Football League players